Aethionema is a genus of flowering plants within the family Brassicaceae. They are known as stonecresses. Stonecresses originate from sunny limestone mountainsides in Europe and West Asia, especially Turkey.

Aethionema have typically perennials, but may be annuals. Their leaves are ovate or linear.

Etymology
The Latin name Aethionema derives from ancient Greek αἴθειν "to light up, kindle" + νῆμα "thread, yarn". The English name "stonecress" derives from its creeping habit and its favoured stony or rocky sites.

Taxonomy
Aethionema is sister to the rest of the genera in the Brassicaceae. The two clades diverged some time during the Eocene.

Species include:

Cultivation
Aethionema species are grown for their profuse racemes of cruciform flowers in shades of red, pink or white, usually produced in spring and early summer. A favoured location is the rock garden or wall crevice. They appreciate well-drained alkaline soil conditions, but can be short-lived. The hybrid cultivar 'Warley Rose' is a subshrub with bright pink flowers. It has gained the Royal Horticultural Society's Award of Garden Merit.

References

 
Brassicaceae genera